Mr. Vampire IV, also known as Mr. Vampire Saga Four, (Chinese: 殭屍叔叔) is a 1988 Hong Kong comedy horror film directed by Ricky Lau and produced by Sammo Hung and Jessica Chan. The film is the fourth of a series of five films directed by Ricky Lau in the Mr. Vampire franchise. Mr. Vampire and its sequels were released as part of the jiangshi cinematic boom in Hong Kong during the 1980s. The Chinese title of the film literally translates to Uncle Vampire.

Plot
In the rural countryside, a bespectacled Taoist priest called Four-eyed Taoist is always at odds with his neighbour, a Buddhist monk called Master Yat-yau. Their respective students, Kar-lok and Ching-ching, are friendly towards each other. The Taoist and Buddhist play pranks on each other.

One day, a convoy of soldiers escorting a coffin passes by their houses. Inside the convoy is Four-eyed's junior, Taoist Crane, and Crane's four disciples, as well as a young prince and his bodyguards. Four-eyed and Yat-yau learn from Crane that there is a jiangshi (Chinese "hopping" vampire) in the coffin, and the convoy is on its way to the capital to let the emperor inspect the jiangshi.

During a thunderstorm that night, rainwater washes away the magical charms on the coffin and the vampire breaks out, becoming more powerful after being struck by a bolt of lightning. The vampire starts attacking everyone in the convoy and infecting them with the "vampire virus", causing them to transform into vampires as well after a short time. Taoist Crane remains behind to hold off the vampire while the prince and his attendant flee towards the houses.

At this critical moment, Four-eyed and Yat-yau both decide to put aside their differences and focus on destroying the vampires.

Cast

Home media

VHS

Laserdisc

VCD

DVD

References

External links
 
 
 Mr. Vampire IV at Hong Kong Cinemagic

1980s comedy horror films
1988 films
Jiangshi films
Hong Kong horror films
Mr. Vampire
Golden Harvest films
Martial arts horror films
Vampire comedy films
1988 comedy films
1980s Hong Kong films